is a railway station in the Tamachi neighborhood of Minato, Tokyo, Japan, operated by the East Japan Railway Company (JR East). It is served by the circular Yamanote Line and the Keihin-Tōhoku Line. All trains stop at this station.

Mita Station on the Asakusa and Mita subway lines is within walking distance, although there is no physical connection and the stations are generally not marked as an interchange on route maps. Tamachi is the nearest JR station to Keio University's Mita campus and Temple University Japan's Mita and Azabu campuses.

Station layout

The station consists of two island platforms providing cross-platform interchange
in the direction of travel between the Yamanote Line (platforms 2 and 3) and the Keihin-Tōhoku Line (platforms 1 and 4). As this is the first cross-platform interchange following the intersection of both lines the platforms are comparatively busy.

Chest-high platform edge doors were installed on the Yamanote Line platforms in February 2013, entering operation in March.

History
The Tokaido Main Line opened in 1872 and passed through Tamachi, which was at the time still submerged under Tokyo Bay. The area to the west of the Tokaido Line was filled in by the end of the 19th century, and the east side filled in during the early 1900s. Tamachi Station opened on December 16, 1909 as an intermediate station on the newly opened Shinagawa-Karasumori section of the Yamanote Line, then operated by Japanese National Railways. It was the sixteenth stop to open on the Yamanote Line.

The area surrounding the station was predominantly industrial until the 1970s, with several confectionery, electronics and machinery factories. New development shifted to commercial buildings beginning with the Morinaga Plaza Building in 1970. The west side of Tamachi underwent a major redevelopment from 1988, resulting in the current elevated deck and pedestrian bridge over the adjacent Dai-Ichi Keihin road.

Passenger statistics
In fiscal 2013, the JR East station was used by an average of 144,433 passengers daily (boarding passengers only), making it the seventeenth-busiest station operated by JR East.

The passenger figures for previous years are as shown below.

See also

 List of railway stations in Japan
Tamachi

References

External links

 JR East station information 

Keihin-Tōhoku Line
Tamachi Station
Railway stations in Japan opened in 1909
Stations of East Japan Railway Company
Yamanote Line